Common names: Namaqua dwarf adder,Spawls S, Branch B (1995). The Dangerous Snakes of Africa. Dubai: Ralph Curtis Books. Oriental Press. 192 pp. . spotted dwarf adder, Schneider's adder.

Bitis schneideri is a species of venomous snake in the subfamily Viperinae of the family Viperidae. The species is native to a small coastal region that straddles the border between Namibia and South Africa. B. scneideri is the smallest species in the genus Bitis and possibly the world's smallest viper. There are no subspecies that are currently recognized as being valid.

Etymology
The specific name, schneideri, was given by Oskar Boettger in honor of "Dr. Oskar Schneider in Dresden ", a friend of Boettger. Oskar Schneider (1841–1903) was a conchologist.

Description

Geographic range and habitat
Bitis schneideri ranges from the white coastal sand dunes of Namibia, near Lüderitz, south to Hondeklip Bay, Little Namaqualand, South Africa. Mallow et al. (2003) describe the range as the transitional regions of the Namib Desert. The viper's habitat comprises a comparatively narrow strip of coastal dunes that appears to be characterized by particularly low seasonality, i.e. small temperature differences between seasons.

The type locality given is "Angra Pequenia" [ Lüderitz Bay, Namibia].

Ecology
Populations of B. schneideri naturally appear to be subject to unusually high annual mortality (39–56%) due to their small size and existence in a very predator-rich environment. As a consequence, it is likely that the species has evolved a higher rate of reproduction (once every year) than is usual among viperids, who commonly only reproduce every other year or more rarely. B. schneideri is viviparous.

Venom
An account is provided by Hurrell (1981) of a bite he sustained on his left index finger. The symptoms included intense pain, pronounced swelling, discoloration and oozing of serum from the punctures. After 24 hours, a 5 mm hematoma developed at the bite site. His condition stabilized after three to four days, with the swelling and pain gradually subsiding. Healing was complete after two weeks, with no loss of function or sensation of the afflicted digit. Minimal local tissue damage and no systemic effects were reported. No antivenin is available for this species.

References

Further reading

Branch, Bill (2004). Field Guide to Snakes and other Reptiles of Southern Africa. Third Revised edition, Second impression. Sanibel Island, Florida: Ralph Curtis Books. 399 pp. . (Bitis schneideri, pp. 118–119 + Plate 14).

External links

Namaqua dwarf adder (Bitis schneideri) at ARKive.

schneideri
Snakes of Africa
Reptiles of Namibia
Reptiles of South Africa
Reptiles described in 1886
Taxa named by Oskar Boettger